İkizce is a neighborhood of the District of Gölbaşı, Ankara Province, Turkey.

References

Populated places in Ankara Province
Neighbourhoods of Gölbaşı, Ankara